Shiqiao could refer to the following locations in China:

Shiqiao station (Guangzhou Metro) (市桥站), station of Line 3 of the Guangzhou Metro
Shiqiao station (Wuhan Metro), station of Line 6 of the Wuhan Metro

Subdistricts 
Shiqiao Subdistrict, Guangzhou (市桥街道), in Panyu District, Guangzhou, Guangdong
Written as "石桥街道":
Shiqiao Subdistrict, Dashiqiao, Jilin
Shiqiao Subdistrict, Zibo, in Zhangdian District, Zibo, Shandong
Shiqiao Subdistrict, Hangzhou, in Xiacheng District, Hangzhou, Zhejiang

Towns 

Shiqiao, Dangtu County, Anhui
Shiqiao, Lu'an (施桥镇), in Jin'an District, Lu'an, Anhui
Shiqiao, Li County, Gansu, in Li County, Gansu
Shiqiao, Cangwu County, in Cangwu County, Guangxi
Shiqiao, Pan County, in Pan County, Guizhou
Shiqiao, Baofeng County, Henan
Shiqiao, Nanyang, Henan, in Wolong District, Nanyang, Henan
Shiqiao, Xiangyang, in Xiangzhou District, Xiangyang, Hubei
Shiqiao, Jiahe County, in Jiahe County, Hunan
Shiqiao, Ganyu County, Jiangsu
Shiqiao, Nanjing, in Pukou District, Nanjing, Jiangsu
Shiqiao, Yongxin County, in Yongxin County, Jiangxi
Shiqiao, Jining, in Rencheng District, Jining, Shandong
Shiqiao, Da County, in Da County, Sichuan
Shiqiao, Jianyang, Sichuan, in Jianyang, Sichuan
Shiqiao, Lu County, in Lu County, Sichuan

Townships 

Shiqiao Township, Li County, Gansu
Shiqiao Township, Qingyuan County, Hebei
Shiqiao Township, Linying County, Henan
Shiqiao Township, Ningling County, Henan
Shiqiao Township, Shaoyang, in Shuangqing District, Shaoyang, Hunan
Shiqiao Township, Fuyu County, Jilin
Shiqiao Township, Chunhua County, in Chunhua County, Shaanxi
Shiqiao Township, Yiyuan County, Shandong
Shiqiao Township, Danleng County, in Danleng County, Sichuan
Shiqiao Township, Wusu, in Wusu City, Xinjiang